The Valea cu Pești is a left tributary of the river Argeș in Romania. It discharges into Lake Vidraru, which is drained by the Argeș.

References

Rivers of Romania
Rivers of Argeș County